GRG or variant thereof, may refer to:
 Gerontology Research Group, (GRG) American social sciences research group
 GRG Banking, a Chinese corporation manufacturing ATMs
 Global Restructuring Group of Royal Bank of Scotland
 GrG, the astronomical abbreviation for group of galaxies
 grg, the ISO:639 language code for the Gira language
 Gathorne Robert Girdlestone (1881–1950), British surgeon
 GRG Matriculation Higher Secondary School, in Coimbatore, Tamil Nadu, India
 Georges River Grammar School, in Georges River, New South Wales